Centurion is the name given to a single Eucalyptus regnans tree growing in Southern Tasmania, Australia, and the world's tallest known Eucalyptus. This discovery places E. regnans as the second-tallest tree species in the world after the coast redwood, and taller than both the Sitka spruce and Coastal Douglas Fir.
It was discovered in August 2008 by employees of Forestry Tasmania while analysing the data collected by LiDAR system used in mapping and assessment of state forest resources.

Condition
The tree is in a small patch of very old forest surrounded by secondary forest and has survived logging and forest fires by coincidence. Near Centurion grew two other giant trees: the 86.5 metre tall E. regnans named Triarius and The Prefect which had a girth of 19m until destroyed in the 2019 fires.

In February 2019 it was damaged from a bushfire that devastated the surrounding area but appears to have initially survived. A new hollow in the base was created by the fire.

Height

Two more recent measurements indicated that the tree was growing, albeit very slowly. In January 2014  the tree was climbed and the tape drop indicated the tree had grown to 99.82m. However, a further tape drop done in 2016 obtained the slightly lower height of 99.67m. Centurion was re-measured again by ground laser in December 2018 and was found to have possibly reached 100.5 meters in height.

The diameter of Centurion is 4.05 metres, its girth exceeds 12 metres, and its volume has been estimated at 268 cubic metres. The name "Centurion" was saved for the hundredth noble tree to be discovered by Forestry Tasmania and coincided with the height of the tree. Named after centurions (Roman officers), the root of the name contains centum, which in Latin means "one hundred". Centurion is alternately known as "the Bradman" as the height of the tree at 99.82 metres was close to the Test run average of the Australian cricketer Donald Bradman.

See also
 List of individual trees
 List of tallest trees
 List of named Eucalyptus trees

References

Individual eucalypts
Tourist attractions in Tasmania
Southern Tasmania
Tasmanian forests
Individual trees in Tasmania